Jeanne d'Arc was a training cruiser built for the  (French Navy) during the late 1920s. She was designed both as a school ship and a fully capable warship. She saw service through the Second World War, escaping to Halifax after the fall of France and eventually joining the Free French forces before the end of the war. Post war, the cruiser resumed her duties as a training ship, being retired in 1964.

Design and description
Jeanne d'Arc was designed specifically to serve as a cadet training ship. The hull was divided by 16 bulkheads into 17 watertight compartments. Her crew consisted of 482 and 156 officer cadets.

Service history
In 1931, Jeanne d'Arc departed for her first cruise under Capitaine de vaisseau André Marquis. As a prestige ship, she toured countries of South America where France wanted to increase her influence. The cruiser visited some of the Black Sea states in 1932.

A log of the ship and the nautical calculation notebook from 1937 can both be found at the "Mircea cel Batran" Naval Academy Museum in Constanța, Romania. During that time, the ship undertook a training voyage around the earth, and the lieutenant kept a very rich log, illustrated with photographs.

During the Second World War, Jeanne d'Arc was assigned to the West Atlantic Naval Division, taking part in blockading German cargo ships in neutral harbours. After an Atlantic rendezvous with the aircraft carrier , the flotilla reached Halifax safely. Jeanne d'Arc then went to the French West Indies, where she remained in the Martinique until July 1943.

In 1943, Jeanne d'Arc joined the Free French. In December, she took part in operations in Corsica and in Operation Dragoon.  She was mentioned in despatches at the order of the Army for services rendered during the war.

She later resumed her service as school cruiser with 27 cruises around the world, before being decommissioned on the 16th of July 1964.

References

Bibliography

External links 

 Netmarine

Cruisers of the French Navy
Ships built in France
1930 ships
World War II cruisers of France